Gerald Petievich is a Serbian-American writer of crime novels, most notably To Live and Die in L.A. and The Quality of the Informant.  

He was a United States Secret Service Special Agent from 1970 to 1985.
Three of his novels were adapted for the screen: To Live and Die in L.A., The Sentinel, and Boiling Point.  Petievich co-wrote the screenplays for all three.

Works
; reprint Penguin Group USA, 1991, 

; reprint Penguin Group (USA) Incorporated, 1991, 
; Gerald Petievich, 2001, 

; Gerald Petievich, 2001, 
; Gerald Petievich, 2001,

References

External links

"Crime writer Gerald Petievich deals in San Gabriel", Publishers Weekly

American spy fiction writers
Living people
United States Secret Service agents
American male novelists
20th-century American novelists
21st-century American novelists
People from San Gabriel, California
20th-century American male writers
21st-century American male writers
Novelists from California
Year of birth missing (living people)